Djarkutan (also Dzharkutan) is a prehistoric proto-urban settlement in Uzbekistan and a center of ancient civilizations in Bactria, the area from which may be the founder of the religion Zarathustra. The settlement on an old stream has two monumental buildings, a potter quarter, a citadel and extensive burial ground. Dzharkutan is located in the west of Surxondaryo Region, in the south of Uzbekistan, about five kilometers southeast of Sherobod and 50 km northwest of Termiz.

External links 
 Uzbekistan: Dzharkutan - Prehistoric proto-urban settlement, German Archaeological Institute (DAI)

Bronze Age sites in Asia
Archaeological sites in Uzbekistan